Niklas Alexander Backman (born 13 November 1988) is a Swedish former professional footballer who played as a centre back. 

He played for Skiljebo SK, AIK, Dalian Aerbin, and AGF during a career that spanned between 2005 and 2021. A full international between 2011 and 2014, he won six caps for the Sweden national team.

Club career 
Backman started playing football for local Västerås team Skiljebo SK as a youth. He played with Skiljebo SK until 2008 when he was transferred to Väsby United in the Swedish second division Superettan. He played 56 games for the club and completed the 2009 season in style at Väsby keeping them in the Superettan. During the summer of 2009, his playing rights were transferred to AIK, but he continued playing matches for Väsby. He made no appearances for AIK during their championship-winning campaign. In 2010, he played his first match for AIK.

On 14 October 2021, 32-year old Backman announced his retirement from football, after he experienced symptoms stemming from his previous head injuries.

International career 
On 19 January 2011, he made his debut for Sweden in a friendly 2–1 away win over Botswana. He won his sixth and final cap on 21 January 2014 in a friendly 2–0 win against Iceland, coming on a substitute for Pontus Jansson in the 83rd minute.

Career statistics

Club

International

Honours 
AIK
 Supercupen: 2010

References

AGF HENTER SVENSK FORSVARSSPILLER I KINA‚ AGF, 18 January 2016

External links
 
 

1988 births
Living people
Swedish footballers
Swedish expatriate footballers
Association football defenders
Sportspeople from Västerås
AIK Fotboll players
AFC Eskilstuna players
Dalian Professional F.C. players
Aarhus Gymnastikforening players
Allsvenskan players
Superettan players
Danish Superliga players
Sweden international footballers
Sweden under-21 international footballers
Swedish expatriate sportspeople in China
Swedish expatriate sportspeople in Denmark
Expatriate footballers in China
Expatriate men's footballers in Denmark
Chinese Super League players
China League One players